Synchalara rhizograpta is a moth in the family Xyloryctidae. It was described by Edward Meyrick in 1934. It is found in Guangdong, China.

References

Synchalara
Moths described in 1934
Taxa named by Edward Meyrick